Peggy Adler (born February 10, 1942) is an American author & illustrator and investigative researcher.  She is the daughter of Irving Adler and Ruth Adler and younger sister of Stephen L. Adler.

Early career
Adler began her professional career as an illustrator in 1958, at the age of 16, when she was co-illustrator of her father's book Weather In Your Life. That same year, she was the sole illustrator of Hot and Cold. She  later illustrated the children's book Numbers Old and New,  as well as authoring and illustrating The Adler Book of Puzzles and Riddles; and The Second Adler Book of Puzzles and Riddles.  Adler married in June 1962 and had two daughters before filing for divorce in early fall 1967.

Authorship
Adler continued working as an illustrator, with work published by the John Day Company, Little, Brown & Company, the Journal of Theoretical Biology, the Journal of Algebra, the National Council of Teachers of Mathematics, World Scientific Publishing the Bronx Zoo, and the Humane Society of the United States.  In the mid-1970s Adler returned to writing as well as illustrating, when Franklin Watts published her book, Metric Puzzles, followed shortly thereafter by Math Puzzles and Geography Puzzles.  In 1976 Adler remarried and for a brief time, in the early 1990s, worked under the name of  Peggy Adler Robohm — but after a few years and as a survivor of domestic violence, resumed the use of her maiden name. Following a hiatus of forty years, Adler authored another book, titled Images of America CLINTON (Arcadia Publishing), which traces the history of Clinton, Connecticut from 1663 to the present.  This book was followed three years later by Pallenberg Wonder Bears - From the Beginning (BearManor Media). Investigations
In 1991, she was retained by self-proclaimed CIA agent, arms dealer and money launderer, Richard Brenneke, to co-author his autobiography.  Discovering evidence in his files contradicting claims regarding his presence at October Surprise conspiracy meetings, she contacted former CIA analyst-turned-journalist, Frank Snepp. This evidence was the basis of Snepp's  February 1992 article for the  Village Voice which outed Brenneke as a con artist. Adler worked with Snepp on additional articles for the "Voice" which went on to prove that the so-called "October Surprise" was a hoax.  Adler's work was also the subject of a chapter in Robert Parry's book, "Trick or Treason: The October Surprise Mystery" and she was interviewed by PBS' Frontline in this regard for an episode which aired in April 1992.  In mid-1992, learning that the House October Surprise Task Force was investigating whether or not there actually had been an October Surprise, she contacted  investigative journalist and author Steven Emerson, who put her in touch with the Task Force so that she could turn over to them the seventy cartons of documents she had hauled east from Brenneke's home in Portland, Oregon, in order to write his memoirs. Subsequently, she  worked as a consultant to the Task Force,  and assisted in drafting and editing the Brenneke section of their final report.

In 2000 and 2001,  she was the researcher for journalist and author Ron Rosenbaum's  articles about Yale's fabled  Skull and Bones, which were published in The New York Observer''.

Community involvement
Adler is active in local affairs in Clinton, Connecticut, the town in which she lives. In 2005 she filed a complaint with Clinton's Board of Ethics, stating that a first term selectman had violated his fiduciary duties as an elected official by voting in favor of the town's purchase of properties in his neighborhood for open space, when he had previously been a "member of a neighborhood group that vigorously opposed" a nearby development proposal.  The Board of Ethics dismissed the complaint, despite the fact that Adler was "never interviewed" and no witnesses were called. Adler later "said the Board of Ethics based its finding on a 'misinterpretation' of both the state law and the town's charter and subsequently, Town Counsel said that they had the final say over such matters and their decision would stand.  Adler later sought, unsuccessfully, to have the Board's decision reviewed by Richard Blumenthal, who was Connecticut's Attorney General at the time. The Board of Selectmen responded to these outcomes by creating "a committee to review the town's code of ethics." As a result, a new ethics ordinance was enacted by the Town of Clinton in November 2006, which became effective in January 2007. This new ordinance was successfully implemented for the first time in early 2012. Adler served as a Police Commissioner  in Clinton for eight years, having first been elected to that position in 2005.  There, she has also served on the  Design Review Board, Historic District Commission, and  Charter Revision Commission.

Intelligence work
In July 2000, the New England Chapter of the Association of Former Intelligence Officers held a meeting in Northampton, Massachusetts.  Adler served as the program coordinator and kept careful track of the "comings and goings at the banquet room to prevent any 'crashers' to the luncheon".  Describing the purpose of the association, Adler was quoted as saying, "A big part of what we try to do is to dispel the misconception that intelligence work is just like what they show in James Bond movies."  The meeting was attended by approximately 20 of the protestors, about whom Adler said, "It's their constitutional right, so long as they pay to attend and dine at the luncheon for the same fee as the membership." In 2001, Adler was awarded the  General Richard G. Stilwell Chairman's Award by the Association of Former Intelligence Officers.

Honoree

In June  2017 Adler received the Albert Nelson Marquis Lifetime Achievement Award  for "career longevity and unwavering excellence in (her) chosen field(s)".

References

External links
 Peggy Adler Collection, Children's Literature Collections, University of Minnesota

American non-fiction children's writers
American women children's writers
American children's writers
American children's book illustrators
20th-century American artists
Artist authors
American investigative journalists
Jewish American writers
Jewish women writers
Artists from Connecticut
People from Clinton, Connecticut
People from Bayside, Queens
1942 births
Living people
20th-century American women
21st-century American Jews
21st-century American women